Gharib Nawaz (born Pamheiba, 1690–1751) was a Meitei ruler of Manipur Kingdom,
ruling from c. 1709 until his death. He introduced Hinduism as the state religion of his kingdom (1717) and changed the name of the kingdom to the Sanskrit Manipur (1724). He changed his royal name from his birth name Pamheipa to the Persianate Gharib Nawaz.

During most of his reign he was engaged in warfare against the weakened Burmese Toungoo Dynasty.

Early life
Pamheiba was born on 23 December 1690 in Manipur to Pitambar Charairongba and was crowned Meidingu ("king") on 28 August 1709 (the 23rd of Thawan, 1631 Saka Era). After converting to Hinduism Pamheiba took the Persianate name "Gharib Nawaz" (also spelt "Garibniwaz").

Military conquests
His reign lasted 39 years. During that time, the realm of Manipur extended from the Irrawaddy River in the east to Cachar and Tripura in the west. At some points during his reign, his realm extended into the Chittagong Hill Tracts.

Burma
Shortly after taking power from his father Charairongba he invaded Burma after the Burmese King insulted his sister. The Burmese King asked for the hand of another of Charairongba's daughters in marriage in 1724. Instead of a princess, the King of Burma was met by cavalry, led by Pamheiba that massacred the Burmese army, and brought many prisoners of war to Imphal. The Burmese sent an expedition in revenge, but it was ambushed in the swamps near Heirok, southwest of Thoubal, and losing heavily retreated in haste. In 1735, Pamheiba invaded Myedu in Shwebo district and carried off loot, cattle and a thousand people. In 1737, Pamheiba again invaded Burma, killed two-thirds of a royal levy, including commander, who came to oppose the invading Manipuris, and swept down to Tabayin in Shwebo district, burning everything they met. Again in 1738, Manipuris went and camped in Thalunbyu west of Sagaing, burnt every house and monastery up to the walls of Ava, stormed the stockade built to protect the Kaunghmudaw Pagoda, slaughtering the Burmese troops like cattle in a pen and killing the commandant, a minister of the Hluttaw Council; the old door-leaves of the pagoda's eastern gateway show a gash made by the sword of Maharaj Pamheiba when he was forcing an entrance.

Tripura
In 1734, Pamheiba invaded Tripura and captured 1100 prisoners, who were absorbed into the Meitei community.

Shan
On account of rise of Burmese Kingdom, the Shan Kingdom of Pong was in danger. In march 1739, the Shans requested Manipur to help them. The envoys from Pong returned to their country after about 19 days. Pamheiba started for Burma to invade Sagaing. After the Battle of Sagaing, Pamheiba made the elder brother of the king of Pong king.

Mon
The king of Ava according to Ningthourol lambuba is called by the name Mangdra who sent a emissary in the court of King Pamheiba with very soft and flattering words requesting him for a matrimonial alliance, in which Mangdra requested to give Princess Satyamala in marriage to him. Further the king of Ava invited king Pamheiba to visit his country. Pamheiba accepted the request and sent back the emissary. Pamheiba then thought out, if the request was sincere, he would give his daughter Satyamala in marriage and on the other hand if it was a pretension, he would teach him a lesson. When he reached the bank of Irawaddy river, he collected information and found the request was a sincere one as the king of Ava was between two fires, one the Meiteis and other the Mons. He wanted to make Manipur his friend and ally to strengthen his force in crushing the Mons. On king of Ava's request, king Pamheiba crossed Irawaddy river and assaulted the Mons where he captured two prominent chiefs of Mons, destroyed the revolting Mons of Koi, he also presented several chopped heads of Mon rebels to his son-in-law king Mangdra.

Religious policy
During the early 18th century, Hindu priests from Sylhet arrived in Manipur to spread Gaudiya Vaishnavism. They were led by Shantidas Adhikari and his associate Guru Gopal Das who succeeded in converting the King from the old Meitei religion to Vaishnavism in 1710. Later during his reign, Pamheiba made Hinduism the official religion, and converted nearly all the Meitei people to Hinduism.

Family
Pamheiba had eight wives, and a large number of sons and daughters. His eldest son, Samjai Khurai-Lakpa, was assassinated by his younger son Chitsai, who came to power after Pamheiba's grandson Gaurisiam. The reign was then followed by Ching-Thang Khomba.

References

Bibliography
 
 
 

Meitei royalty
Hindu monarchs
Gaudiya religious leaders
Devotees of Krishna
Converts to Hinduism
1690 births
1751 deaths